Samuel Foster was an English mathematician and astronomer.

Samuel Foster or Sam Foster may also refer to:

Samuel Foster House, a historic house in Reading, Massachusetts
Samuel Foster, character in The Fosters (1976 TV series)
 Sam Foster, founder of Foster Grant, the eyewear company
 Sam Foster (politician) (1931–2014), Ulster Unionist politician
 Sam Foster (Coronation Street), a fictional character on the British soap opera Coronation Street